The Treaty Four Reserve Grounds 77 are an Indian reserve in Saskatchewan, Canada, shared by 33 band governments from Saskatchewan and Manitoba. The Reserve Grounds are located adjacent to and west of Fort Qu'Appelle. In the 2016 Canadian Census, they recorded a population of 15 living in 6 of their 8 total private dwellings.

All bands are signatories to Treaty 4. This Reserve may belong to Assiniboine Chief Long Lodge #77, who was a treaty signatory chief to Treaty 4 in 1877 at Cypress Hills.  Further this land was designated to be shared by all Treaty 4 bands in 1996 to commemorate the signing of the Treaty Land Entitlement agreements between First Nation and the Provincial and Federal Governments.  It was given the #77 after this.

List of bands sharing the reserve

Carry the Kettle Nakoda First Nation
Coté First Nation
Cowessess First Nation
Day Star First Nation
Fishing Lake First Nation
Gambler First Nation
George Gordon First Nation
Kahkewistahaw First Nation
Kawacatoose First Nation
Keeseekoose First Nation
Kinistin Saulteaux Nation
Little Black Bear First Nation
Muscowpetung Saulteaux Nation
Muskowekwan First Nation
Nekaneet Cree Nation
Ocean Man First Nation
Ochapowace Nation
Okanese First Nation
Pasqua First Nation
Peepeekisis Cree Nation
Pheasant Rump Nakota First Nation
Piapot First Nation
Pine Creek First Nation
Rolling River First Nation
Sapotaweyak Cree Nation
Star Blanket Cree Nation
The Key First Nation
Tootinaowaziibeeng Treaty Reserve
Waywayseecappo First Nation
White Bear First Nations
Wuskwi Sipihk First Nation
Yellow Quill First Nation
Zagime Anishinabek

References

Carry the Kettle Nakoda Nation
Cote First Nation
Cowessess First Nation
Day Star First Nation
Division No. 6, Saskatchewan
Fishing Lake First Nation
Gambler First Nation
George Gordon First Nation
Indian reserves in Saskatchewan
Kahkewistahaw First Nation
Kawacatoose First Nation
Keeseekoose First Nation
Kinistin Saulteaux Nation
Little Black Bear First Nation
Muscowpetung Saulteaux Nation
Muskowekwan First Nation
Nekaneet Cree Nation
Ocean Man First Nation
Ochapowace Nation
Okanese First Nation
Pasqua First Nation
Peepeekisis Cree Nation
Pheasant Rump Nakota First Nation
Piapot Cree Nation
Pine Creek First Nation
Rolling River First Nation
Sapotaweyak Cree Nation
Star Blanket Cree Nation
The Key First Nation
Tootinaowaziibeeng Treaty Reserve
Waywayseecappo First Nation
White Bear First Nations
Wuskwi Sipihk First Nation
Yellow Quill First Nation
Zagime Anishinabek